The 2014 Liga Nusantara South Sulawesi season is the first edition of Liga Nusantara South Sulawesi is a qualifying round of the 2014 Liga Nusantara.

The competition scheduled starts in May 2014.

Teams
This season there are all registered South Sulawesi club participants.

League table
Divided into one group.

Result

References 

South Sulawesi